HLA-B12 (B12) is an HLA-B serotype. B12 is a broad antigen serotype that recognizes the B44 and B45 split antigen serotypes.

References

1